The 1977 Indian general election polls in United Andhra Pradesh were held for 42 seats in the state. The result was a landslide victory for the Indian National Congress (Indira) which won 41 out of 42 seats.

United Andhra Pradesh

Voting and Results

Results by Alliance

See also 
Elections in Andhra Pradesh

References

External links
 Website of Election Commission of India
 CNN-IBN Lok Sabha Election History

Indian general elections in Andhra Pradesh
Indian general election, 1977
Andhra Pradesh